Poison in the Zoo is a 1952 West German thriller film directed by Hans Müller and Wolfgang Staudte and starring Irene von Meyendorff, Carl Raddatz and Petra Peters.

Production
During production in 1951, the director Wolfgang Staudte was removed and replaced when the West German authorities refused to consider it eligible for state subsidies unless Staudte declare that he would no longer work for the DEFA studios of the Communist East German state. Staudte, who had made several major productions for DEFA, refused and was replaced by Müller.

It was shot at the Wandsbek Studios in Hamburg and on location in the city's Tierpark Hagenbeck. The film's sets were designed by Albrecht Becker and Herbert Kirchhoff.

Synopsis
After a series of mysterious deaths of animals at a zoo the police are called in to investigate.

Cast
 Irene von Meyendorff as Vera Pauly
 Carl Raddatz as Dr. Martin Rettberg
 Petra Peters as Jutta Flamm
 Ernst Schröder as Oskar Beck
 Hermann Speelmans as Kriminalrat Walter Glasbrenner
 Nicolas Koline as Wärter Mathias
 Kurt Meister as Oberwärter Kruschke
 Otto Reimer as Wärter Robby
 Helmut Peine as Kriminalkommissar Werner
 Tilla Hohmann as Wirtschafterin Karola
 Hella Attenberger as Gaby Rettberg
 Alwin Pauli as Oberwärter Berger
 Bruno Klockmann as Polizeichef Dr. Wöltje

References

Bibliography 
 Hans-Michael Bock and Tim Bergfelder. The Concise Cinegraph: An Encyclopedia of German Cinema. Berghahn Books, 2009.
 Hanna Schissler. The Miracle Years: A Cultural History of West Germany, 1949–1968. Princeton University Press, 2001.

External links 
 

1952 films
1950s thriller films
German thriller films
West German films
1950s German-language films
Films directed by Hans Müller
Films directed by Wolfgang Staudte
Films set in zoos
East Germany–West Germany relations
German black-and-white films
1950s German films
Films shot at Wandsbek Studios
Films shot in Hamburg